Martin Belay (born March 15, 1991) is a Czech professional ice hockey player. He played with BK Mladá Boleslav in the Czech Extraliga during the 2010–11 Czech Extraliga season.

References

External links

1991 births
Living people
BK Mladá Boleslav players
Czech ice hockey forwards
Sportspeople from Ostrava
LHK Jestřábi Prostějov players
HC Berounští Medvědi players
HC Stadion Litoměřice players